Miller Altman Anderson (December 27, 1922 – October 29, 1965) was an American diver, who won his first national diving championship in 1942, in the 3-meter springboard. A flyer during World War II, he was forced to parachute from his plane on his 112th mission, and his left leg was severely injured. A silver plate was inserted into his knee, and he had to learn to dive all over again after the war.

Representing Ohio State, Anderson won the NCAA 3-meter championship, the national 1-meter championship, and the national 3-meter championship in 1946, 1947, and 1948. He also won silver medals in the springboard event at the 1948 and 1952 Summer Olympics. Anderson was the first to perform a forward one-and-a-half somersault with two twists and a backward one-and-a-half with one twist.

Anderson died of a heart attack in his home on October 29, 1965, aged 42. In 1967 he was inducted into the International Swimming Hall of Fame.

See also
 List of members of the International Swimming Hall of Fame

References

1922 births
1965 deaths
Divers at the 1948 Summer Olympics
Divers at the 1952 Summer Olympics
Olympic silver medalists for the United States in diving
Sportspeople from Chicago
American male divers
Medalists at the 1952 Summer Olympics
Medalists at the 1948 Summer Olympics
Pan American Games silver medalists for the United States
Pan American Games bronze medalists for the United States
Pan American Games medalists in diving
Divers at the 1951 Pan American Games
United States Army Air Forces pilots of World War II
United States Army Air Forces officers
Medalists at the 1951 Pan American Games
Military personnel from Illinois